Melanophryniscus fulvoguttatus is a species of toad in the family Bufonidae.
It is found in Argentina, Brazil, and Paraguay.
Its natural habitats are subtropical or tropical moist shrubland, subtropical or tropical seasonally wet or flooded lowland grassland, and intermittent freshwater marshes.
It is threatened by habitat loss.

References

fulvoguttatus
Amphibians described in 1937
Taxonomy articles created by Polbot